Charles Cornwallis was one of the two MPs for Eye between 1662 and 1675.

References

Eye, Suffolk